Institut français is a French-government funded industrial and commercial institution promoting French culture overseas.

It has numerous branches around the world, including -
 Institut français (Munich)
 Institut français de Vienne
Not to be confused with the languages school Alliance française.

Institut français may also refer to:
Institut Français (Marrakesh), a performing arts institution in Marrakesh

See also
Institut Français d'Afrique Noire, a cultural and scientific institute in the nations of the former French West Africa
Institut Français d'Archéologie Orientale, a French research institute based in Cairo, Egypt
Institut français d'opinion publique, an international marketing firm
Institut Français de Recherche en Iran, an archaeological and historical institute in Tehran
Institut français des relations internationales, independent research and debate institution dedicated to international affairs, based in Paris, France
Institut français du pétrole, a public research organisation in France
Institut français du Proche-Orient, part of the network of French Research Centres abroad
Institut français Léopold Sédar Senghor, a Dakar-based organizational body dedicated to the diffusion of French culture in Senegal